The A-series light bulb is the "classic" glass light bulb shape that has been the most commonly used type for general lighting service (GLS) applications since the early 20th century. It has a pear-like shape and is typically fitted to either an Edison screw or a bayonet cap base. The number that follows the "A" designation indicates the nominal major diameter of the bulb, either in one-eighth inch units in the United States or in millimeters in the rest of the world.

Physical outline 

The most commonly used A-series light bulb type is an A60 bulb  (or its USC equivalent, the A19 bulb), which is 60 mm (19/8 in or 2 3/8 in) wide at its widest point and approximately 110 mm (4 3/8 in) in length.
Other sizes with a data sheet in IEC 60064 are A50, A55, A67, A68, A71, A75, and A80.
Another common A-series light bulb type is the A15 bulb which is commonly used in the US for appliances and ceiling fans.

Socket type 

Most A19/A60 light bulbs come with an E26 type (i.e. 26 millimeters in diameter) in countries with a mains supply voltage of 100–120 volts, or an E27 type (i.e. 27 millimeters in diameter) in countries with 220–240 volts AC. A-series light bulbs using the older B22 bayonet twist type base are less common; they can be found in the UK and many British Commonwealth countries.

Specifications 

IEC/TR 60887:2010 defines the A bulb shape as: "A bulb shape having a spherical end section that is joined to the neck by a radius that (a) has a centre outside the bulb, (b) has a magnitude greater than the radius of the spherical section, (c) and is tangent to both the neck and the curve of the spherical end section.". The same standard also defines in addition to the A shape also bulged (B), conical (C), elliptical (E), flame (F), Globular (G), (K), mushroom (M), (P), reflector (R), straight-sided (S) and tubular (T) bulb shapes, as well as several modifier letters and special shapes. Very similar to the A shape are the P shape ("A bulb having a spherical end section, and a conical mid section, the sides of which are tangent to the curve of the spherical section"), and its PS variant ("Tubular neck section below the bulb and above the approximate reference line").

ANSI C79.1-2002, IS 14897:2000, and JIS C 7710:1988  define the "A shape" as "a bulb shape having a spherical end section that is joined to the neck by a radius", where the radius is greater than that of the sphere, corresponds to an osculating circle outside the light bulb, and is tangent to both the neck and the sphere. The Energy Star certification only requires omnidirectional light bulbs to fit the overall dimensions of the corresponding ANSI bulb type.

Lamp types 

Although most A-shape bulbs have historically used incandescent lighting technology, some other technologies  – such as compact fluorescent (CFL) or LED lamps – have been used in A-shape bulbs more recently.

References

Types of lamp